Frank T. "Skids" Caruso (December 26, 1911 – December 31, 1983) was a Chicago mobster and crime boss involved in illegal gambling and racketeering activities for the Chicago Outfit criminal organization during the 1950s.

Originally from Chicago's Near North Side (known as "The Patch"), his relatives include brothers Joseph (Joe Shoes), Leo and Bruno Caruso, including his brother-in-law First Ward alderman Fred Roti, and son Frank (Little Frankie) Caruso, Jr. As a youth, Caruso ran with the infamous Forty-Two Gang, which included future gangsters such as Sam "Momo" Giancana.

Starting in 1935, Caruso amassed a criminal record of at least 13 arrests on charges including grand larceny, illegal gambling and conspiracy. In 1956, on the death of his father-in-law, Bruno Roti, Caruso became the owner of several South Side, Chicago casinos and became the head of the 26th Street/Chinatown "crew". Caruso now became involved in illegal gambling in Chicago's First Ward. On the side, Caruso operated a legitimate business, Caruso Plumbing, in the Chicago suburb of Hillside, Illinois. In 1983, Caruso died of natural causes.

Further reading
Cooley, Robert and Hillel Levin. When Corruption Was King: How I Helped the Mob Rule Chicago, Then Brought the Outfit Down. New York: Carroll & Graf Publishers, 2004. 
United States. Congress. House. Committee on the Judiciary. Subcommittee on Crime. Administration's Efforts Against the Influence of Organized Crime in the Laborer's International Union of North America. 1997. 
United States. Congress. Senate. Committee on Governmental Affairs. Permanent Subcommittee on Investigations. Organized Crime in Chicago: Hearing Before the Permanent Subcommittee on Investigations of the Permanent Subcommittee on Investigations. 1983. 
A Report on Chicago Crime. Chicago: Chicago Crime Commission Reports, 1954-1968.

External links
Chicago Sun Times: One families rise, a century of power 
IHO order barring Bruno, Leo, Frank Caruso from Laborers Union

References 

1911 births
1983 deaths
American gangsters of Italian descent
Chicago Outfit mobsters